State Route 134 (abbreviated SR 134) is a north–south route in the U.S. State of Maine that connects SR 41 and its southern points, such as Winthrop, with SR 43 and its northern points, such as Anson. SR 134 intersects U.S. Route 2 (US 2) and SR 27 in the town of New Sharon. Before circa 1946, it was known as SR 41, while the current SR 41 was known as SR 134.

Major intersections

References

External links

Floodgap Roadgap's RoadsAroundME: Maine State Route 134

134
Transportation in Franklin County, Maine
Transportation in Somerset County, Maine